Anti-American sentiment in Iran is not new; the chant "Death to America" has been in use in Iran since at least the Islamic revolution in 1979, along with other phrases often represented as anti-American. A 1953 coup which involved the CIA was cited as a grievance. State-sponsored murals characterised as anti-American dot the streets of Tehran. It has been suggested that under Ayatollah Khomeini anti-Americanism was little more than a way to distinguish between domestic supporters and detractors, and even the phrase "Great Satan" which has previously been associated with anti-Americanism, appears to now signify either the United States or the United Kingdom.

Some studies show that anti-Americanism in Iran is related to support for political Islam. US attempts to cripple Iran's economy have also significantly made Anti-American sentiment more common. Students from Tehran have been documented saying about US sanctions: “The more they push, the more it will lead to a rise in anti-Americanism.” and "It’s just a vicious circle."

See also
Anti-American sentiment
"Great Satan"
Anti-Israeli sentiment
"Little Satan"
Death to America

References

Iran
Iran–United States relations
Politics of Iran